Raymond Ellison (born 31 December 1950) was an English professional footballer who played as a full-back for Sunderland.

References

1950 births
Living people
Footballers from Newcastle upon Tyne
English footballers
Association football fullbacks
Newcastle United F.C. players
Sunderland A.F.C. players
Torquay United F.C. players
Workington A.F.C. players
Gateshead United F.C. players
Tow Law Town F.C. players
Whitley Bay F.C. players
English Football League players